In These Stones, Horizons Sing is a work for chorus and orchestra composed by Karl Jenkins.  It was commissioned for the opening of Wales Millennium Centre and first performed at its opening in November 2004.  The work includes text in both English and Welsh written by Menna Elfyn, Grahame Davies, and Gwyneth Lewis.

Structure
The work is divided into four short movements; the first movement is further divided into two parts.  A typical performance takes 10–15 minutes.  The movements are:
"Agorawd 
Part I: Cân yr Alltud"
Part II: Nawr!"
"Grey"
"Eleni Ganed"
"In These Stones Horizons Sing"

Recordings
The work is included on the compact disc Requiem, which also features Karl Jenkins' Requiem.  The performance is by the West Kazakhstan Philharmonic Orchestra, conducted by Jenkins himself.  The recording was released on EMI.

References

External links 
 In These Stones, Horizons Sing, catalogue information from Boosey & Hawkes

Compositions by Karl Jenkins
2004 compositions
Choral compositions